Upendra Singh Kushwaha (born 6 February 1960) is an Indian politician and a former Member of Bihar Legislative Council and Bihar Legislative Assembly. He has also served as the Minister of State for Human Resources and Development in the Government of India.  Kushwaha is a former Member of parliament from the Karakat constituency in Rohtas district, Bihar and a former member of the Rajya Sabha as well. He was the leader of his own party named Rashtriya Samata Party (RSP) which merged into  Janata Dal (United) (JDU)  in 2009. Latter, he formed Rashtriya Lok Samata Party (RLSP), which  also merged  with JD(U)  in 2021. On 20 February 2023, he resigned from all positions of Janata Dal (United) and formed his own party called  Rashtriya Lok Janata Dal due to his political problems with JD(U) & Nitish Kumar.

Early life
Upendra Singh was born to Muneshwar Singh and Muneshwari Devi on 6 February 1960 in Vaishali, Bihar into a middle-class family. He graduated from Patna Science College and then did MA in Political Science from BR Ambedkar Bihar University, Muzaffarpur. Kushwaha also worked as a lecturer in the politics department of Samata College. Later he added Kushwaha to his name.

Political career
Upendra Kushwaha stepped into the world of politics in 1985. From 1985 to 1988, he was the state general secretary of Yuva Lok Dal. As per political analysts, he enjoyed the support of voters of the Kushwaha caste in the various districts of the Magadh and Shahabad division, which includes Jahanabad, Gaya, Arwal, Aurangabad, Arrah, Rohtas, Buxar and Samastipur. Hence, the majority of the political workers accompanying Upendra Kushwaha hail from this region. While there are other districts, where the members of the Kushwaha caste are not under his influence.

Later, he became National General-Secretary, Yuva Janata Dal, 1988–93. He had also worked as General-Secretary for Samata Party, 1994–2002. Kushwaha was Member of Bihar Legislative Assembly in 2000-2005 and appointed as Deputy Leader (Samata Party) Bihar Legislative Assembly. In March 2004 after loksabha election Sushil Modi was elected to Loksabha and the same time number of MLA's of JD(U) increased than BJP. Since leader of JD(U) changed his party. So kushwaha became leader of opposition.

Kushwaha started his electoral politics in 2000 winning from Jandaha. He was dismissed from the Janata Dal (United) in 2007. Kushwaha founded the Rashtriya Samata Party in February 2009. The party was formed in the backdrop of alleged marginalisation of the  Koeri caste and autocratic rule by the Nitish Kumar government in Bihar. The formation of the party was supported by Chhagan Bhujbal, the deputy chief minister of Maharashtra.  In November 2009, the party was merged into the Janata Dal (United) with the mending of ties between Kushwaha and Kumar.

On 4 January 2013, Upendra Kushwaha who at the time was a Rajya Sabha member, resigned from the Janata Dal (United). He alleged that the Nitish model had failed and that the law and order situation was becoming as bad as it had been 7 years ago. He further alleged that the Nitish Kumar runs his government through autocratic means and that he had turned the Janata Dal (United) into his "pocket organisation".
Kushwaha founded the Rashtriya Lok Samata Party on 3 March 2013 and unveiled the name and flag of his party at a rally at the historic Gandhi Maidan. He contested the 2014 Lok Sabha elections as part of the National Democratic Alliance (NDA), led by Narendra Modi. He was elected from the Karakat constituency and was appointed as Minister of State in Human Resource Development ministry. In December 2018, he resigned from the ministry and left the NDA, accusing Modi of not fulfilling his poll promises regarding Bihar.

Initially, Kushwaha indicated his discontent with the NDA leadership  due to diminishing importance as an ally. Kushwaha's party RLSP finally broke out from NDA alliance as it was not given appropriate seats in Lok Sabha elections of 2019. The NDA leadership was skeptical of Kushwaha's influence on member of Koeri caste and believed that even without his support  they could win the elections in Bihar. It is believed that Nitish Kumar too holds considerable hold on both koeri and kurmi community, as a counter to which BJP had earlier selected Keshav Prasad Maurya as its Uttar Pradesh chief. Hence, they were ready to face exodus of Kushwaha. Meanwhile, they were sure of reaping the popularity of Nitish, who was now an ally of BJP and had gained considerable reputation in Bihar due to his development  model.

Kushwaha hence joined United Progressive Alliance front, which contained Rashtriya Janata Dal, Hindustani Awam Morcha, as well as Vikassheel Insaan Party. He contested 2019 Lok Sabha election from two seats namely Karakat as well as Ujiyarpur.
Kushwaha lost from both the seats. 
The grand alliance of above mentioned parties under the leadership of Tejashwi Yadav was not able to win even a single seat in Bihar in 2019 Lok Sabha election.

In the course of 2019 Lok Sabha Elections, Upendra Kushwaha's speech sparked controversy when he referred to the newly formed  alliance of his party and Rashtriya Janata Dal as 'Kheer'. According to political analysts, RLSP represents Kushwahas who are also called Koeris in Bihar while RJD represents Yadavs. The traditional occupation of these castes being growing paddy as well as cattle domestication. Hence, reference to Kheer was said to be the implicit indication to alliance of two influential backward castes.
After losing in 2019 Lok Sabha elections, Kushwaha once again made a controversial statement. He warned NDA leadership that if the result of elections is deteriorated, the blood will flow on streets. However, later on a notice from Election Commission of India, he clarified that his intention was not of provoking violence.

In September 2020, prior to  the election to Bihar Legislative Assembly, Upendra Kushwaha's party RLSP eschewed the Rashtriya Janata Dal and Congress led coalition which was formed during the Lok Sabha elections of 2019 to counter National Democratic Alliance in Bihar. Kushwaha announced the formation of third front called Grand Democratic Secular Front (GDSF) in partnership with Bahujan Samaj Party (BSP). This front  contested on all 243 seats of Bihar Assembly against three other political fronts namely NDA, which included JD (U) and BJP;  UPA, which included RJD, Congress and Vikassheel Insaan Party and one another alliance which contained various small parties led by Jan Adhikar Party. Kushwaha sought the unacceptability of the leadership of Tejashwi Yadav as the reason behind his separation from the 'Grand Alliance'.

The GSDF suffered a serious setback with only success in the form of AIMIM getting five seats in Muslim dominated areas of Bihar (particularly Simanchal) and BSP managing to get one seats. Though the allies had obtained less percentage of votes compared to Kushwaha's RLSP (it secured 1.77% votes), it failed to win any seats. Also; the RLSP showed good presence in number of constituencies including Dinara and Saffron.

Kushwaha parted his ways with Janata Dal (United) on two occasions, but after the split of 2013, his political graph went down and the Rashtriya Lok Samata Party suffered massive defeats in various elections, most notably in the Lok Sabha elections of 2019 and the assembly elections of 2020. The weaning away of support of Kushwaha caste also resulted in setback for JD(U), which was reduced to 43 seats in 2020 election to Bihar Legislative Assembly. This led to a merger in which RLSP was merged into its parent JD(U) and Kushwaha was made party's parliamentary board president. Soon after his induction into JD(U), Kushwaha was nominated to the Legislative Council, the upper house of Bihar Legislature.

After 2022, anti-coalition politics
Kushwaha engaged in anti-coalition politics against the Mahagathbandhan (Bihar) in the 2023, when he challenged the leadership of Tejashwi Yadav as the successor of Nitish Kumar. In several press conferences, he claimed that JDU has weakened and there was need to strengthen it once again by reviving the core support base of the party. Kushwaha also demanded the greater role for the Koeri caste in the electoral politics of Bihar. He alleged the incumbent Chief Minister Nitish Kumar and Deputy CM Tejaswi Yadav of grabbing the political rights of other OBC castes and further stressed that after the Yadavs and Kurmis, the premiership of the state of Bihar should pass into the hands of a Kushwaha leader, considering the fact that leader of these three castes together launched Triveni Sangh political party, way back in 1930s. He also demanded that Extremely Backward Castes, which have been neglected for long in the electoral politics, should play active role and urged Kumar and Yadav to take steps to push them forward.

Amidst speculations that he will join the Bhartiya Janata Party, Kushwaha declared that he will remain in JDU, working for strengthening it. Despite the anti-coalition statements made by Kushwaha, JDU didn't take any step to warn him or oust him from the party. Moreover, Nitish Kumar left the question of deciding whether to stay in the JDU or tender resignation to Kushwaha himself. Meanwhile, Kumar in a statement to media, also asked kushwaha to settle the dispute, if any, through conciliation within the party itself. According to political analysts, it was the declaration of making Tejaswi Yadav the successor of Nitish Kumar, which dashed the hopes of Kushwaha, making him contest the choice of Yadav over him. This made Kushwaha worry about the future of JDU, which, according to him was on the verge of decline and such a step would seal the fate of the party.

The continuos attack on Nitish Kumar's descision to promote Tejashwi Yadav as his successor by Kushwaha didn't brought any action by the JDU high command, but the national president of JDU, Lalan Singh in a press statement stated that Kushwaha is no more the "president of parliamentary board of the JDU", the position to which latter was appointed after merging his party RLSP into the ruling JDU.

Attack on convoy
Amidst political crisis in the state, and Kushwaha being an important factor steering it, the convoy of Kushwaha was attacked during a visit to Bhojpur. It was latter found that the attackers belonged to an organisation called "Kushvanshi Sena" and they had ideological conflict with the former union minister. The Sena members also alleged that they just showed black flags to the convoy and the supporters and political activists of Kushwaha thrashed them in actual.

Virasat Bachao Yatra
Soon after formation of new political party called Rashtriya Lok Janata Dal, Kushwaha announced the launch of Virasat Bachao Yatra, a statewide tour, which included visiting important places in Bihar and connecting with ground level political workers to gain public support against the Nitish Kumar government. The yatra, in its first phase, started from Bhitiharwa Village of West Champaran district and covered Muzaffarpur, Sitamarhi, Bajpatti, Madhubani, Araria, Madhepura, Samastipur and Saran district. The second phase of this tour was planned to cover Nalanda, Sheikhpura, Bhagalpur, Nawada, Gaya, Rohtas, Sasaram, Bhojpur, and Arwal districts.

Ideology

On Reservation
In 2022, when he was serving as the Parliamentary Board president of Janata Dal (United), Kushwaha accused Bhartiya Janata Party (BJP) of plotting to destroy the caste based reservation for the Other Backward Castes. He also criticised the key leadership of BJP for remaining silent upon the issue of conducting a nationwide "caste based census". According to him, while he was serving as Union Minister, as an ally of BJP, the senior leaders of BJP promised to conduct a "caste based census".

On Farm Bills

The Rashtriya Lok Samata Party (RLSP) of Kushwaha organised Kisan Choupals against the Farm Bills. These village level conferences were aimed at making farmers aware of the provisions of the Farm Laws, brought by National Democratic Alliance government in 2021. According to the political activists of RLSP, the laws were not in interest of small farmers. He further announced the participation of his political workers in the all india protest organised by the farmers in Delhi , if the bills were not taken back. Kushwaha himself asked the Narendra Modi government to take the bills back, as it was supposed to serve the interest of only big farmers and the corporates and was detrimental for small and marginal farmers.

On Liquor ban
In 2016, Government of Bihar under Nitish Kumar passed a bill in the Bihar Legislative Assembly to ban the liquor consumption in the state. Severe punishment were imposed on those foung guilty, in a bid to stop the liquors to reach from supply to the source of consumption. Kushwaha in 2022, in a press statement, spoke against the liquor policy of government. He was a part of Janata Dal (United) then, yet, he was against the way, the ban was being implemented. He accused the government officials of colluding with the suppliers and asked the people to come forward to make the prohibition successful.

Tenure as Minister of State (MoS) for Education

On collegium system
While holding the office of Minister of State (Human resource development), now called Ministry of state (Education), Kushwaha raised the demand of reforming the Collegium System of appointment to higher judiciary. Highlighting the humble beginning of Prime Minister Narendra Modi and incumbent President Ram Nath Kovind, he asked: why opportunity to become judges of higher judiciary should be closed for the communities considered as "weaker section". Kushwaha further alleged the Supreme Court judges of worrying about their own successors and practicing nepotism. Following the demand the Rashtriya Lok Samata Party also organised the discussion on reforms in Collegium System in ten state capitals beginning with New Delhi.
 
In order to support the reservation in the judiciary for the "weaker section", Kushwaha also launched Halla Bol Darwaja Khol Campaign. During the same time, an anti-reservation showdown was being organised across the state of Bihar and while travelling to East Champaran to meet Prime Minister Narendra Modi, Kushwaha was greeted with protest by some of the anti-reservationists. According to the Police, a person called Sumit Mishra was arrested in connection with the misbehaviour with Kushwaha, while sixty other unidentified protesters remained our of reach.

On education
Kushwaha alleged the  RJD rule of 15 years in the state of Bihar to be responsible behind sorry state of affairs of the educational institutions. In a convention organised by his party RLSP in Rajgir during his tenure as Union Minister, he put many demands before the Nitish Kumar government to rectify the education system of the state. The demands were aimed towards bringing all round development of lower as well as higher educational institutions.

Kushwaha was has raised the demand of bringing quality education to Indian villages. According to him, 90% of those who are in need of education are found in villages; there has been massive degradation in quality of government schools in these villages. Meanwhile, he also lauded the Central Board of Secondary Education for maintaining a decent quality of education across the country.

In 2016, he inaugurated the new infrastructure and new building for the All India Council for Technical Education. Kushwaha, here at the inauguration meeting, expressed concern over engineers getting minimum salary of 10,000-12,000 in the country after being graduated from private technical institutions. He urged to create a system, where the companies themselves visit the campuses to pick up meritorious engineers.

See also
List of politicians from Bihar
Rashtriya Lok Janata Dal

References

Further reading

1960 births
Living people
Rajya Sabha members from Bihar
India MPs 2014–2019
People from Vaishali district
Lok Sabha members from Bihar
People from Rohtas District
Rashtriya Lok Samata politicians
Narendra Modi ministry
Leaders of the Opposition in the Bihar Legislative Assembly
Babasaheb Bhimrao Ambedkar Bihar University alumni
Bihar MLAs 2000–2005
Janata Dal (United) politicians